The 1958 Cincinnati Redlegs season consisted of the Redlegs finishing in fourth place in the National League (NL) standings with a record of 76–78, 16 games behind the Milwaukee Braves.  The Redlegs played their home games at Crosley Field, and drew 788,582 fans, eighth and last in the NL. The season started with Birdie Tebbetts managing the club, but after the Redlegs went 52–61, Tebbetts was replaced in August by Jimmy Dykes, who went 24–17 the rest of the way.

Offseason 
 October 8, 1957: Steve Bilko was purchased by the Redlegs from the Chicago Cubs.
 December 5, 1957: Curt Flood and Joe Taylor were traded by the Redlegs to the St. Louis Cardinals for Marty Kutyna, Ted Wieand, and Willard Schmidt.
 December 28, 1957: Ted Kluszewski was traded by the Redlegs to the Pittsburgh Pirates for Dee Fondy.

Regular season

Season standings

Record vs. opponents

Notable transactions 
 April 21, 1958: Diego Seguí was released by the Redlegs.
 May 17, 1958: Eddie Miksis was signed as a free agent by the Redlegs.
 June 15, 1958: Steve Bilko, Johnny Klippstein and players to be named later were traded by the Redlegs to the Los Angeles Dodgers for Don Newcombe. The Redlegs completed the deal by sending Art Fowler and Charlie Rabe to the Dodgers on June 23.
 June 24, 1958: Walt Dropo was selected off waivers by the Redlegs from the Chicago White Sox.

Roster

Player stats

Batting

Starters by position 
Note: Pos = Position; G = Games played; AB = At bats; H = Hits; Avg. = Batting average; HR = Home runs; RBI = Runs batted in

Other batters 
Note: G = Games played; AB = At bats; H = Hits; Avg. = Batting average; HR = Home runs; RBI = Runs batted in

Pitching

Starting pitchers 
Note: G = Games pitched; IP = Innings pitched; W = Wins; L = Losses; ERA = Earned run average; SO = Strikeouts

Other pitchers 
Note: G = Games pitched; IP = Innings pitched; W = Wins; L = Losses; ERA = Earned run average; SO = Strikeouts

Relief pitchers 
Note: G = Games pitched; W = Wins; L = Losses; SV = Saves; ERA = Earned run average; SO = Strikeouts

Farm system 

LEAGUE CHAMPIONS: Geneva

References

External links
1958 Cincinnati Redlegs season at Baseball Reference

Cincinnati Reds seasons
Cincinnati Redlegs season
Cincinnati Reds